Kattumannarkoil is a panchayat town and taluk headquarters in Cuddalore district in the Indian state of Tamil Nadu. Kattumannarkoil Town Panchayat constituted in 1892. The town is coming under the administrative territory of Cuddalore District. The town extends over an area of 19.425 km2. The town is situated along 25 km South West of Chidambaram and lies on the Chidambaram - Coimbatore Highway and 25 km East of  Srimushnam and a similar distance north-east of Gangaikonda Cholapuram. The entire road route from Sethiathoppu to Kattumannarkoil runs alongside the Veeranam Lake. The newly built Muttam bridge provides connectivity to Mayladuthurai in the south at the distance of 30 km.

Demographics
 India census, Kattumannarkoil had a population of 22,683. Males constitute 51% of the population and females 49%. Kattumannarkoil has an average literacy rate of 76%, higher than the national average of 59.5%: male literacy is 82%, and female literacy is 71%. In Kattumannarkoil, 11% of the population is under 6 years of age.

Climate

Like most of coastal Tamil Nadu, the areas adjoining Veeranam tank has a sub-tropical climate receiving most of the rainfall during the North-East monsoons from Oct - Dec. 
Being close to the coast cyclones that strike the area have a profound impact, resulting in heavy rains. Two rainfall monitoring stations are located in Veeranam Tank one at its right bank i.e. Kattumannarkoil and another at left bank i.e. Sethiathope. The average rainfall in these stations is more than the state average of 950 mm. During the last 18 years the average annual rainfall in Kattumannarkoil is 1025 mm. In Sethiathope, the average annual rainfall during the last 25 years is 1273 mm. But due to the vagaries of the North-East monsoon, Veeranam tank often has to depend on water from Mettur dam.

Veeranam Lake and water resources

Veeranam Lake is a major tank attached to Chidambaram Division of South Arcot. PWD circle and the Lalpet Section of PWD is in charge of the maintenance and operation of irrigation systems of this tank. The tank provides the 35% of water requirement to the city of Chennai.

The location of this tank is between latitudes 11 15 ‘ E and 11  25’ E and Longitudes 79   30’ N and 79   35’ N.

Veeranam Tank is one of the biggest tanks in Tamil Nadu and also an age old one. This tank has been referred briefly in the book called " Ponniyen Selvan" Written by the famous author ‘Kalki’ in the year 1950. This book gives the information on the age of this tank and it has been mentioned that the tank was formed at a period of more than  1000 years by the Prince Rajathithar Son of Parandage Chola. The tank was originally called as Veeranarayanan Tank.

When king Paranthaga Cholan I ruled over Chola Kingdom during the 10th century i.e. 907 to 935 AD he wanted to improve the Irrigation facilities in and around Chidambaram. He formed a village called as ‘Veera Narayana Sathurvethi Mangalam.
This Village was gifted to the Scholars who were well versed in the Four Vedhas. This Village is now called as Kattumannarkoil which is situated in the right flank of Veeranam Tank. He then formed the biggest tank and named it as ‘Veera Narayanan Eri’ ‘Veera Narayanan’ is the nickname given to king Paranthaga Cholan I for his Valour. Subsequently, this tank is now called Veeranam Tank.

During the later period of Chola Kingdom, King Rajendra Cholan I who ruled during the period 1012 AD to 1044 AD, Spread his kingdom up to Ganges. He conquered the lands up to River Ganges. In Memory of his Victory he formed the Village ‘ Gangai Konda Cholapuram’  during the year 1024 AD. In addition to that in order to improve the Irrigation facilities in and around the new Village, he formed a new tank and called it as ‘Chola ‘ Gangam’. He made a link between ‘Chola gangam’ and Veeranarayanan Eri so that the former surpluses into the later. The tank ‘Chola Gangam’ is now called as ‘ Ponneri Tank’ which is situated at the road connecting Jeyamkondam and Gangaikonda Cholapuram. These details were collected from Saraswathi Mahal Library at Tanjore.

Politics 
Kattumannarkoil union has around 55 villages and the town panchayat has 18 wards. 
The Kattumannarkoil assembly constituency , which is a reserved constituency is part of Chidambaram (Lok Sabha constituency). The Kattumannarkoil member of the Tamil Nadu Legislative Assembly is Sindhanai Selvan from the  VCK Party.

Attractions 

Kattumannarkoil is surrounded by paddy fields that look stunning when irrigated. The road runs along the side of the Cauvery Canal from Lalpet village to Kumaratchi and is approximately 8.5 kilometres long towards Chidambaram. It would be a wonderful experience to travel with the chillness of Canel water.

The other side road from Lalpet to Sethiathoppu, which is laid around the largest lake Veeranam for around 13 kilometers, would be a very pleasant experience for travellers.

Villages
 

Kuppupillai chavadi

References

Cities and towns in Cuddalore district